The Energy Regulatory Authority (ERE) is an independent public entity tasked to ensure a sustainable and secure electricity supply for the Albanian consumer by establishing an operational and competitive electricity market, taking into account the consumer's interest.

ERE organizes hearings with stakeholders from the three energy operators KESH, OST, and OSHEE to discuss price increases and tariff changes for energy production.

See also
 KESH (Albanian Power Corporation)
 OST (Operatori i Sistemit të Transmetimit)
 OSHEE (Electric Power Distribution Operator)
 Electricity distribution companies by country

References

Authority
Electric power in Albania
Energy agencies of Albania
Energy regulatory authorities
Regulation in Albania